Donovan v. Bierwirth, 680 F.2d 263 (2d Cir. 1982), is a US labor law case, concerning the fiduciary duty owed to an employee benefit plan governed by the Employee Retirement Income Security Act (ERISA).

Facts
The Secretary of Labor claimed that trustees of the Grumman Corporation Pension Plan breached a fiduciary duty in §§ 1104(a) and 1106(b) by not tendering stock when LTV launched a takeover bid of Grumman Corp, and also by buying more shares.

Judgment
For the Second Circuit, Judge Friendly held that faced with a conflict of interest, a fiduciary is expected to obtain independent counsel and perhaps to suspend his or her service as fiduciary for a time.

Judges Pierce and Metzner concurred.

See also

United States labor law

References

External links
 

1982 in United States case law
United States Court of Appeals for the Second Circuit cases
United States labor case law